Karen Baker Landers is a two-time Academy Award-winning sound editor. She also has won and been nominated for several Motion Picture Sound Editors awards as well as winning the BAFTA Award for Best Sound. She often works with Per Hallberg.

She has over 80 credits.

Academy Awards
Both Oscars are for Best Sound Editing.

80th Academy Awards: The Bourne Ultimatum. Shared with Per Hallberg. Won.
85th Academy Awards: Skyfall. Shared with Per Hallberg. Won. (Tied with Zero Dark Thirty for which the winner was Paul N. J. Ottosson).

References

External links

Sound editors
Best Sound Editing Academy Award winners
Best Sound BAFTA Award winners
Living people
Date of birth missing (living people)
Place of birth missing (living people)
Women sound editors
Year of birth missing (living people)